Jasionowo Dębowskie  is a village in the administrative district of Gmina Sztabin, within Augustów County, Podlaskie Voivodeship, in north-eastern Poland. According to the 2011 census, the population was 66 people.

References

Villages in Augustów County